Leucocythere is a genus of ostracods in family Limnocytheridae. It contains at least the following species:
Leucocythere algeriensis Martens, 1989
Leucocythere helenae Martens, 1991
Leucocythere mirabilis Kaufmann, 1892

References

Podocopida genera
Limnocytheridae
Taxonomy articles created by Polbot